Bowman is an unincorporated community and census-designated place (CDP) in Craighead County, Arkansas, United States. It was first listed as a CDP in the 2020 census with a population of 75.

Demographics

2020 census

Note: the US Census treats Hispanic/Latino as an ethnic category. This table excludes Latinos from the racial categories and assigns them to a separate category. Hispanics/Latinos can be of any race.

April 27, 2011 tornado
At 3:08 p.m. CDT on April 27, 2011, a tornado hit Bowman as part of the 2011 Super Outbreak. The tornado caused roof damage to five homes and a business garage, and destroyed a storage shed.

Bowman has a Trucking Business ( Jeff Spencer Trucking ), a co-op and a few small stores. no Mayor and no post office. Bowman uses Lake City's zip code ( 72437 )

References

Census-designated places in Craighead County, Arkansas
Census-designated places in Arkansas
Unincorporated communities in Craighead County, Arkansas
Unincorporated communities in Arkansas